Outrageous Cherry were an American psychedelic pop / power pop band from Detroit, Michigan, United States.

Outrageous Cherry formed in 1991, and soon expanded to a four-piece after performing live in 1993. The group has released 13 albums, including 2014's The Digital Age.

Larry Ray, the band's guitarist, died at the age of 63 from lung cancer on October 24, 2017.

Former members
 Matthew Smith - vocals, guitar
 Colleen Burke - bass
 Larry Ray - guitar
 Chad Gilchrist - bass
 Deb Agolli - drums
 Suzanna Mroz - drums

Discography

Albums
 Outrageous Cherry (Bar/None, 1994) (vinyl in 2010 via Microfiche Records)
 X-Rays in the Cloudnine (Mind Expansion, 1996) (ME-016)
 Stereo Action Rent Party (Third Gear Records, 1996)
 Nothing's Gonna Cheer You Up (Third Gear, 1997)
 Out There in the Dark (Del-Fi Records, 1999)
 The Book of Spectral Projections (Rainbow Quartz Records, 2001)
 Supernatural Equinox (Rainbow Quartz, 2003)
 Stay Right Here for a Little While (EP) (Rainbow Quartz, 2003)
 Why Don't We Talk About Something Else (EP) (Rainbow Quartz, 2004)
 Our Love Will Change the World (Rainbow Quartz, 2005)
 Stay Happy (Rainbow Quartz, 2006)
 Universal Malcontents (Alive Records, 2009)
 Seemingly Solid Reality (Alive Records, 2010)
 The Digital Age (Burger Records, 2014)
 Meet You in the Shadows (Burger Records, 2018)

References

Rock music groups from Michigan
Musical groups from Detroit
Psychedelic pop music groups
Alive Naturalsound Records artists
American power pop groups
Del-Fi Records artists